California's 6th State Senate district is one of 40 California State Senate districts. It is currently represented by Republican Roger Niello of Fair Oaks.

District profile 
The district encompasses the core of the Sacramento metropolitan area, including the state capital of Sacramento and surrounding suburbs. The ethnically and socioeconomically diverse district is a mix of urban and suburban areas.

Sacramento County – 62.6%
 Arden-Arcade
 Elk Grove
 Florin
 Fruitridge Pocket
 La Riviera
 Lemon Hill
 Parkway
 Rosemont
 Sacramento
 Vineyard

Yolo County – 24.3%
 West Sacramento

Election results from statewide races

List of senators 
Due to redistricting, the 6th district has been moved around different parts of the state. The current iteration resulted from the 2011 redistricting by the California Citizens Redistricting Commission.

Election results 1994 - present

2018

2014

2010

2006

2002

1998

1994

See also 
 California State Senate
 California State Senate districts
 Districts in California

References

External links 
 District map from the California Citizens Redistricting Commission

06
Government of Sacramento, California
Government of Sacramento County, California
Government of Yolo County, California
Elk Grove, California
West Sacramento, California